Badminton is a racquet sport played by two opposing players or two opposing pairs.

Badminton may also refer to:
Badminton, Blaenau Gwent, a community in Wales
Badminton, Gloucestershire, a village in England giving its name to
Badminton House, the estate of the Duke of Beaufort in Gloucestershire
Badminton Horse Trials, the three-day event
Badminton School in Bristol, England
Badminton (album), the 2003 album by breakcore artist Venetian Snares
Badmingtons, a punk rock band from the Republic of Macedonia
The Badminton Library, a series of books on sport from the turn of the twentieth century